Joaquim Casimiro Júnior (30 May 1808 in Lisbon – 28 December 1862) was a Portuguese composer and organist.  He composed a number of operas and operettas, as well as much sacred music.

References
operone (German)
in the Biblioteca Nacional de Portugal

Portuguese classical composers
Portuguese classical organists
Male classical organists
Portuguese opera composers
People from Lisbon
1808 births
1862 deaths
19th-century Portuguese people
19th-century classical composers
Portuguese male classical composers
19th-century male musicians
19th-century organists